Solre is a river in France that runs in the Département Nord in the region Hauts-de-France. It originates from the confluence of two source streams at Solre-le-Château, in the  Avesnois Regional Nature Park. The river generally drains to the northwest and empties at 22.4 kilometers east of Maubeuge, in the municipality of Rousies, as a right tributary to the channeled Sambre.

Places on the river 
 Solre-le-Château
 Obrechies
 Ferrière-la-Petite
 Ferrière-la-Grande
 Rousies

References 

Rivers of France
Rivers of Nord (French department)
Rivers of Hauts-de-France